The General Administration of Customs (GAC) is a ministry-level administrative agency within the government of the People's Republic of China. It is responsible for the collection of value added tax (VAT), customs duties, excise duties, and other indirect taxes such as air passenger duty, climate change levy, insurance premium tax, landfill tax and aggregates levy. It is also responsible for managing the import and export of goods and services into mainland China. The current director is Yu Jianhua, appointed in May 2022.

Customs emblem
The emblem was designed by a customs officer named Chen Tiebao in 1951. The emblem consists of a golden key and the Caduceus of Hermes, crossing with each other. It was officially adopted on 1 October 1953. The emblem was not used from 1966 to 1985, as it was considered "too capitalist".

See also 
 Chinese Maritime Customs Service, for the agency's pre-1949 predecessor
 China Immigration Inspection
 Customs and Excise Department (Hong Kong)
 Macau Custom Service under the Secretariat for Security (Macau)

References

External links 
 

Government agencies of China
Customs services
1949 establishments in China
Government agencies established in 1949
State Council of the People's Republic of China